Bakeyevo is the name of several rural localities in Russia:
Bakeyevo, Beloretsky District, Republic of Bashkortostan, a selo in Zigazinsky Selsoviet of Beloretsky District of the Republic of Bashkortostan
Bakeyevo, Sterlibashevsky District, Republic of Bashkortostan, a selo in Bakeyevsky Selsoviet of Sterlibashevsky District of the Republic of Bashkortostan
Bakeyevo, Moscow Oblast, a village under the administrative jurisdiction of  the work settlement of Andreyevka in Solnechnogorsky District of Moscow Oblast